The Triton 27, also called the Pearson 27, is an American sailboat that was designed by Doug Peterson and first built in 1984.

The design is a unauthorized development of Peterson's International Offshore Rule Half Ton class Chaser 29 racer, using the same hull design. The molds had been owned by US Yachts, a division of Bayliner, to build the US Yachts US 27 and were sold to Pearson Yachts.

Production
The design was built by Pearson Yachts in the United States, starting in 1984 and renamed the Pearson 27 in 1986. The boat was only built in small numbers and is now out of production.

Design
The Triton 27 is a recreational keelboat, built predominantly of fiberglass, with wood trim. It has a masthead sloop rig, a raked stem, a reverse transom, an internally mounted spade-type rudder controlled by a wheel and a fixed fin keel or optional shoal draft keel. It displaces  and carries  of ballast.

See also
List of sailing boat types

References

Keelboats
1980s sailboat type designs
Sailing yachts
Sailboat type designs by Doug Peterson
Sailboat types built by Pearson Yachts